James D. Mauseth is an American botanist and botanical author. He is Professor Emeritus in the Department of Integrative Biology at the University of Texas at Austin.

Born in 1948 in Washington, he did his undergraduate and PhD studies at the University of Washington, Seattle. He joined the University of Texas at Austin in 1975, where he remained until his retirement in 2017. His research has focused on plants with unusual forms, like cacti and parasitic plants. He has authored the widely used textbooks Plant Anatomy and Botany: An Introduction to Plant Biology.

Books
 Plant Anatomy, 1988
 Botany: An Introduction to Plant Biology, 1991 (6th edition 2017)
 Plants and People, 2012

References

American botanical writers
20th-century American botanists
21st-century American botanists
University of Texas at Austin faculty
1948 births
Living people
Place of birth missing (living people)
20th-century American non-fiction writers
21st-century American non-fiction writers